Buenos Aires is a canton in the Puntarenas province of Costa Rica. The head city is in Buenos Aires district.

History 
A law of 26 June 1914, created a canton by the name of "De Osa". This new entity encompassed much of the national territory of southernmost Costa Rica.

Buenos Aires was created on 29 July 1940 by decree 185, segregated from "De Osa". The remaining territorial extension is now Osa canton.

Geography 
Buenos Aires has an area of  km² and a mean elevation of  metres.

The canton includes a portion of the Cordillera de Talamanca along its northeastern border. The valleys of the General River, Coto Brus River and Térraba River form the core of the canton, and coastal mountain ranges set the limits on the southeast side.

Districts 
The canton of Buenos Aires is subdivided into the following districts:
 Buenos Aires
 Volcán
 Potrero Grande
 Boruca
 Pilas
 Colinas
 Chánguena
 Briolley
 Brunka

Demographics 

For the 2011 census, Buenos Aires had a population of  inhabitants.

Transportation

Road transportation 
The canton is covered by the following road routes:

References 

Cantons of Puntarenas Province
Populated places in Puntarenas Province